Tullio Gregory (28 January 1929 – 2 March 2019) was an Italian philosopher and historian of medieval and early modern philosophy. He was professor in La Sapienza, Rome, and collaborated with several institutions, either in Italy or abroad. His work and interpretations have shed new light on Medieval thought and on the connection to early modern philosophy (from Montaigne to Descartes).

References

Philosophy academics
Italian philosophers
1929 births
2019 deaths
Italian historians of philosophy
Descartes scholars
Academic staff of the Sapienza University of Rome